Narela is a sub-district of Delhi. It could also refer to the following places in India:

Nerela (Vidhan Sabha constituency) (sometimes called Narela), Delhi Legislative Assembly constituency centered around the above sub-district 
Narela (Madhya Pradesh Vidhan Sabha constituency), constituency of the Madhya Pradesh Legislative Assembly